The Suzuki Crosscage is an electric motorcycle with a futuristic look equipped with an AC synchronous electric motor, a power system fuel cell type PEFC (polymer electrolyte) air-cooled, a reservoir for storing 35 MPa high-pressure hydrogen and a lithium-ion battery auxiliary high performance. It has an autonomy of 200 km. 

The manufacturer has not yet announced a release schedule.

See also
 Hydrogen ship
 Hydrogen vehicle
 Hydrogen economy

References
Suzuki Crosscage

Crosscage
Hydrogen motorcycles